is a Japanese bi-monthly Yaoi/Shōjo manga magazine published by Tokuma Shoten. First released in 1994, the magazine has since been adapted into two different spinoffs.

History
Chara was first published in 1994 as an offshoot of Animage. In the 22nd issue of Chara, it was announced that a split-off magazine entitled "Chara Selection" would co-circulate. Later on, another split-off entitled Char@ was made. The website for Chara was designed by C&S Design in 2014.

Notable published works

Chara

Interview with the Vampire (Manga adaptation)
 (Golden Wings)
Merry checker

Chara Selection

References

External links
Official website 
Bookshelf - (A list of the magazines works) 

1994 establishments in Japan
Bi-monthly manga magazines published in Japan
Magazines established in 1994
Shōjo manga magazines
Yaoi manga magazines
Magazines published in Tokyo